Scheels Center is a 5,460 seat multi-purpose arena in Fargo, North Dakota. It was built in 1970 and was home to the North Dakota State University Bison women's basketball and wrestling teams through the 2013–14 season. It was previously named the Bison Sports Arena. The main facility was renamed the Sanford Health Athletic Complex and the basketball arena was renamed the Scheels Center. It reopened under the new name for the 2016–17 season.

Main Renovation
Fundraising was launched as part of the Edge Campaign to privately raise money for the extension and renovation of the Bison Sports Arena. On October 11, 2013, the NDSU Foundation voted unanimously to back the project up to 41 million, pending legislative approval. On November 23, 2013, the State Board Of Higher Education unanimously approved the project. On December 11, 2013, the project was unanimously approved.

The renovation included:

 Scheels Center basketball arena
 Shelly Ellig indoor track and field facility
  basketball training facility
  performance training center
  Hall of Fame display
 team store
 ticket office
 Student Athlete Academic Center
 New 4 sided HD video  board will be  installed.

The entire Sanford Health Athletic Complex project was completed in November of 2016. The Scheels Center officially opened on November 11, 2016 when the North Dakota State men's basketball team opened their season against Arkansas State in a game that the Bison won, 76-66.

Venue firsts
Only firsts since the SHAC renovation was completed

Men's Basketball
First game: November 11, 2016 vs. Arkansas State
First win: November 11, 2016 vs. Arkansas State (76-66)
First loss: December 7, 2016 vs. North Dakota (56-74)
First conference win: December 31, 2016 vs. Omaha (82-70)
First conference loss: February 4, 2017 vs. South Dakota (66-76)
Source:

Women's Basketball
First game: November 12, 2016 vs. Dickinson State
First win: November 12, 2016 vs. Dickinson State (70-63)
First loss: November 22, 2016 vs. Colorado (59-76)
First conference win: January 4, 2017 vs. South Dakota (83-73)
First conference loss: December 28, 2016 vs. South Dakota State (66-69)
Source:

Wrestling
First duel: November 6, 2016 vs. #14 Iowa State
First duel win: November 6, 2016 vs. #14 Iowa State (25-16)
First duel loss: February 3, 2017 vs. Utah Valley (16-22)
First conference duel win: November 6, 2016 vs. #14 Iowa State (25-16)
First conference duel loss: February 3, 2016 vs. Utah Valley (16-22)
Source:

See also
 List of NCAA Division I basketball arenas

References

External links
Official website

College basketball venues in the United States
Sports venues in North Dakota
Buildings and structures in Fargo, North Dakota
North Dakota State Bison basketball venues
Basketball venues in North Dakota
1970 establishments in North Dakota
Sports venues completed in 1970
College indoor track and field venues in the United States
Athletics (track and field) venues in North Dakota
College wrestling venues in the United States